Sany is a Chinese heavy construction equipment manufacturer.

Sany may also refer to:
Sány, a village and municipality in the Czech Republic
Sany Pitbull (born c. 1970), Brazilian favela musician